The human gene AGK encodes the enzyme mitochondrial acylglycerol kinase.

The protein encoded by this gene is a mitochondrial membrane protein involved in lipid and glycerolipid metabolism. It catalyzes the formation of phosphatidic and lysophosphatidic acids. Defects in this gene have been associated with mitochondrial DNA depletion syndrome 10.

Diseases associated with AGK include cataracts and cardiomyopathy. An important paralog of this gene is CERKL.

Structure
The AGK gene is located on the 7th chromosome, with its specific location being 7q34. The gene contains 18 exons. AGK encodes a 47.1 kDa protein that is composed of 422 amino acids; 32 peptides have been observed through mass spectrometry data.

Function
Acylglycerol kinase synthesizes phosphatidic and lysophosphatidic acids. The enzyme uses ATP to put a phosphate group on acyl glycerol and diacylglycerol. It catalyzes the following reactions:

ATP + acylglycerol = ADP + acyl-sn-glycerol 3-phosphate.
ATP + 1,2-diacyl-sn-glycerol = ADP + 1,2-diacyl-sn-glycerol 3-phosphate.

The enzyme is involved in the more general pathway of fatty acid metabolism. AGK also has an implicated role in the assembly of the adenine nucleotide translocator in the inner mitochondrial membrane.

Clinical significance
Mutations in the AGK gene were the first to be implicated in isolated cataract development, although it is unclear whether these mutations cause a change in lipid composition of the lenses, or if signaling results in the defect. This gene has also been associated with Sengers syndrome. Two different phenotypes have been observed. One form of the disorder presented as vascular strokes, lactic acidosis, cardiomyopathy and cataracts, abnormal muscle cell histopathology and mitochondrial function. In those patients, there was also a markedly high rate of citrate synthase. The second phenotype presented with similar clinical symptoms, but no strokes. As phosphatidic acid is also involved in the synthesis of phospholipids, its loss will result in changes to the lipid composition of the inner mitochondrial membrane. These effects manifest as cataract formation in the eye, respiratory chain dysfunction and cardiac hypertrophy in heart tissue.

AGK expression has also been correlated with certain cancer phenotypes. AGK expression, in coordination with AGX, was not detected in non-neoplastic epithelia, while both were weakly expressed in the majority of high-grade intra-epithelial neoplasia (HG-PIN). Expressions of both enzymes were significantly correlated with primary Gleason grade of cancer foci and capsular invasion. Overexpression of AGK sustains constitutive JAK2/STAT3 activation, consequently promoting the cancer stem cell population and augmenting the tumorigenicity of esophageal squamous cell carcinoma (ESCC) cells both in vivo and in vitro. Furthermore, AGK levels significantly increases STAT3 phosphorylation, poorer disease-free survival, and shorter overall survival in primary ESCC. More importantly, AGK expression was significantly correlated with JAK2/STAT3 hyperactivation in ESCC, as well as in lung and breast cancer. In prostate cancer, AGK expression amplifies EGF signaling pathways, thus playing a significant role in the development of prostate cancer. It’s also correlated tumor-nodule-metastasis (TNM) classification breast cancer, and an overall shorter overall survival.

Interactions
In the progression of diabetic retinopathy, the ATX-AGK-LPA signaling axis plays a significant role.

In the proliferation of prostate cancer, AGK interacts with and regulates PC-3 prostate cancer cells markedly increased formation and secretion of LPA. This increase also affects the EGF receptor and sustained activation of extracellular signal related kinase (ERK) 1/2, culminating in enhanced cell proliferation. Acylglycerol kinase also augments JAK2/STAT3 signaling in esophageal squamous cells.

References

External links

Further reading

 
 
 

Enzymes
Genes